Łubno may refer to the following places in Poland:
Łubno, Lublin Voivodeship (east Poland)
Łubno, Łódź Voivodeship (central Poland)
Łubno, Świętokrzyskie Voivodeship (south-central Poland)
Łubno, Subcarpathian Voivodeship (south-east Poland)
Łubno, Masovian Voivodeship (east-central Poland)
Łubno, Greater Poland Voivodeship (west-central Poland)
Łubno, Pomeranian Voivodeship (north Poland)

See also
Lubno (disambiguation)